Jean-Claude Colliard (15 March 1946 – 27 March 2014) was a French academic and senior public servant.

Colliard was born in Paris.  He graduated from the Paris Institute of Political Studies (Sciences Po), and obtained a Ph.D. in law from the University of Paris. He also held an agrégation in Public Law and Political Science.

He was a member of the Constitutional Council of France (from 1998 to 2007), and later was the chancellor of Université Panthéon Sorbonne Paris 1, France's top secondary institution. He was Chief of Staff for President François Mitterrand from 1982 to 1988. He was Chief of Staff to Laurent Fabius, President of the National Assembly from 1988 to 1992.

He was a recognized specialist in Comparative Government. He was director of the Department of Political Science at University Paris 1 – Panthéon-Sorbonne in 1995. He died on 27 March 2014, aged 68.

References

1946 births
2014 deaths
French political scientists
Civil servants from Paris
Lycée Henri-IV alumni
Sciences Po alumni
University of Paris alumni
Academic staff of Pantheon-Sorbonne University
Commandeurs of the Légion d'honneur
French male non-fiction writers